Stanley Allen may refer to:

H. Stanley Allen (1873–1954), English physicist
Stan Allen, American architect

See also
Stanley Allan (born 1886), English footballer
Allen Stanley (1926–2013), Canadian ice hockey player